Looney Creek (sometimes called Looneys Creek) is a stream in Shelby County in the U.S. state of Missouri. It is a tributary of the North River.

Looney Creek has the name of Peter Looney, an early settler.

See also
List of rivers of Missouri

References

Rivers of Shelby County, Missouri
Rivers of Missouri